Clermont Carn, also known as Black Mountain, is a mountain that rises to  in the Cooley Mountains of County Louth, Ireland. It is at the border with Northern Ireland, and is also the location of the Clermont Carn transmission site. The mountain's name refers to an ancient burial cairn on its summit, and to Lord Clermont of Ravensdale.

Cairn
The 'carn' in the mountain's name refers to an ancient burial monument on its summit, also known as 'Black Mountain Chambered Cairn' or 'Ravensdale Park Cairn'. Three lintels are in position and the rear part is corbelled. Surrounding this was a court (5.5 × 7 m) and a gallery containing at least two burial chambers.

It was built in the early Neolithic, c. 4000–3500 BC, and forms part of the Clyde-Carlingford group of court cairns. In recent decades the site has been disturbed by quarrying and blasting. It is a protected National Monument.

Gallery

References 

Mountains and hills of County Louth